Michael Ford (born 11 October 1962) is a former Australian rules footballer who played with Footscray and St Kilda in the Victorian/Australian Football League (VFL/AFL).

Ford, a defender from Bairnsdale, was already 22 when he started his AFL career. He played finals in his first year and appeared in a further six seasons for Footscray. St Kilda secured his services in the 1992 Pre-season Draft, with pick 10, but he would only play two senior games for his new club.

He spent the next stage of his career at Sandringham and was a member of their 1992 premiership side.

In 1994 he coached Oakleigh, in what would be their final season in the Victorian Football Association. A knee injury forced him to retire as a player.

He coached Springvale to a premiership in 1995, when they defeated his former club Sandringham in the grand final. Despite this he was sacked as coach and replaced by Brad Gotch.

Ford has been appointed coach of North Shore Australian Football Club for 2020.

References

1962 births
Australian rules footballers from Victoria (Australia)
Western Bulldogs players
St Kilda Football Club players
Bairnsdale Football Club players
Sandringham Football Club players
Oakleigh Football Club players
Oakleigh Football Club coaches
Casey Demons coaches
Living people